Riviera Beach is a city in Palm Beach County, Florida, United States, which was incorporated September 29, 1922. Due to the location of its eastern boundary, it is also the easternmost municipality in the Miami metropolitan area, which was home to an estimated 6,012,331 people in 2015. In the 2020 U.S. Census, the total population of Riviera Beach residents was 37,604 people.

Riviera Beach is predominantly an African-American city and it is on the list of U.S. cities with African American majority populations. It is home to the Port of Palm Beach and a United States Coast Guard station, and has its own marina. Riviera Beach is home to Blue Heron Bridge, one of the country's top-rated beach dive sites. In 2015, Riviera Beach renamed part of Old Dixie Highway that runs inside the city limits as President Barack Obama Highway. The city is also home to Rapids Water Park, a water park attraction for both tourists and residents.

History
Riviera Beach was originally called Oak Lawn, but the settlement was renamed Riviera in 1893. It wasn't until 1941 that "Beach" was added, though it was incorporated in 1922 as only the "Town of Riviera". In 1959, it converted from a "town" status to the present-day "City of Riviera Beach". For the first half of the 20th century, its nickname was "Conch Town", after the many Conch people (Bahamians and Bahamian Americans) who resided in the city. The city was named after the French Riviera.

Geography
The eastern part of the city includes most of Singer Island, a peninsula on the Atlantic coast of Palm Beach County, Florida, which is separated from the mainland portion of the city by Lake Worth's Lake Worth Lagoon.

Climate
Riviera Beach has a tropical climate, more specifically a tropical rainforest climate (Köppen climate classification Af), as its driest month (February) averages 64.8mm of precipitation, meeting the minimum standard of 60mm in the driest month needed to qualify for that designation. Much of the year is warm to hot in Riviera Beach, and frost is extremely rare. As is typical in South Florida, there are two basic seasons in Riviera Beach, a mild and dry winter (November through April), and a hot and wet summer (May through October). Daily thundershowers are common in the hot season, though they are brief. The city of Riviera Beach is home to many varieties of tropical vegetation, which can be seen in its variety of plants, trees, and flowers all over South Florida and the city itself.

Demographics

2020 census

Note: the US Census treats Hispanic/Latino as an ethnic category. This table excludes Latinos from the racial categories and assigns them to a separate category. Hispanics/Latinos can be of any race.

2010 census
As of the census of 2010, there were 17,124 households, out of which 27.7% were vacant. In 2000, 29.3% had children under the age of 18 living with them, 37.1% were married couples living together, 27.0% had a female householder with no husband present, and 29.3% were non-families. 22.3% of all households were made up of individuals, and 6.1% had someone living alone who was 65 years of age or older. The average household size was 3.04 and the average family size was 4.62.

In 2000, the population was spread out, with 37.5% under the age of 18, 10.0% from 18 to 24, 27.1% from 25 to 44, 20.7% from 45 to 64, and 8.7% who were 65 years of age or older. The median age was 30 years. For every 100 females, there were 107.5 males. For every 100 females age 18 and over, there were 105.6 males. The median income for a household in the city was $28,715, and the median income for a family was $26,756.

In 2000, males had a median income of $27,232 versus $22,410 for females. The per capita income for the city was $13,159. About 29.6% of families and 32.3%  of the population were below the poverty line, including 35.1% of those under age 18 and 21.4% of those age 65 or over.

As of 2000, those who solely spoke English at home accounted for 90.30% of all residents, while speakers of Spanish were 4.71%, French Creole 2.42%, and French speakers 0.95%.

Government 
Riviera Beach has a mayor–council–manager form of government. Ronnie Felder was elected to a second three-year term as its mayor in 2022. The city is divided into five districts, each with a council member; the mayor does not vote.

The Riviera Beach City Council has received national attention for its repeated clashes with local activist Fane Lozman, starting with his successful lawsuit, brought under Florida's open-meetings law, to prevent them from seizing the marina under eminent domain and selling it to private developers. In 2013, Lozman won against the city at the United States Supreme Court in an admiralty case after the city seized his floating home. In 2018, Lozman won a rare second victory at the court, this one arising from his arrest during a city council meeting in November 2006.

Education
Public Elementary Schools
Dr. Mary McLeod Bethune Elementary School
Lincoln Elementary School (formerly Lincoln High School was only for black students during segregation, and before that it was a called West Riviera Junior High School)
Washington Elementary School
West Riviera Elementary School

Public Middle School
John F Kennedy Middle School (originally John F. Kennedy High School was only for black students during segregation)

Public High Schools
Suncoast High School (originally Riviera Beach High School was only for white students during segregation)
Inlet Grove High School

Charter High School
Riviera Beach Preparatory and Achievement Academy (Grades 5–12)

Transportation
Riviera Beach is served by several bus routes operated by PalmTran.

Business and economy
EDF Incorporated (1978)

Notable people
Anthony Carter – Michigan and NFL wide receiver, 3x Pro Bowl selection
Devin Hester – NFL record-holding kick returner for Chicago Bears and Atlanta Falcons, member of National Football League 100th Anniversary All-Time Team
Elizabeth Jacobson – USAF, killed in Iraq War
Richard Rellford – professional basketball player
Burt Reynolds – actor, moved to Riviera Beach in 1946 at the age of 10; his father, a police officer, was once the Riviera Beach Chief of Police
Willie Young – NFL defensive end

See also
 Amaryllis (ship)

References

External links
 Online version (made available for public use by the State Archives of Florida) of a 1939 WPA exhibit on the Conchs of Riviera Beach, Florida 

1922 establishments in Florida
Cities in Florida
Cities in Palm Beach County, Florida
Populated coastal places in Florida on the Atlantic Ocean
Populated places established in 1922
Port cities and towns of the Florida Atlantic coast